Coxwold railway station was on the Thirsk and Malton line of the York, Newcastle and Berwick Railway in North Yorkshire, England that served the village of Coxwold. The station opened on 1 June 1853.

The station was host to a camping coach from 1935 to 1939, and possibly one for some of 1934, the station was also used as an overnight stop for touring camping coach service in 1935.

The station closed for regular passenger traffic in 1953 but was subsequently used for occasional special trains until 1958.

The line remained open for goods traffic until 10 August 1964, after which the track was subsequently lifted.

The station has since been converted into a private house.

References

External links
 Coxwold station on navigable 1947 O. S. map

Disused railway stations in North Yorkshire
Former North Eastern Railway (UK) stations
Railway stations in Great Britain opened in 1853
Railway stations in Great Britain closed in 1953